Danny Desmond Makkelie (born 28 January 1983) is a Dutch professional football referee. Besides refereeing he works as a police inspector in Rotterdam and as a referee coach for the Royal Dutch Football Association. He has been a FIFA listed referee since 2011.

Career 
He took charge of the final of the 2012 UEFA European Under-19 Football Championship as a UEFA Elite referee.  On 18 August 2020, UEFA named 37-years old Makkelie as the referee for the 2020 UEFA Europa League Final between Sevilla and Inter Milan. Previously, he was an additional assistant referee in the 2018 UEFA Europa League Final. He also refereed the semifinal between Brazil's Palmeiras and Mexico's UANL in the 2020 FIFA Club World Cup in Qatar. Makkelie was selected as a referee for the UEFA Euro 2020, where he was in charge of two group stage matches, the R16 clash between England and Germany and the Wembley semi-final between England and Denmark.

Makkelie was criticised for a decision in the Euro 2020 semi-final between England and Denmark. He awarded England a contentious penalty in extra time for a foul on Raheem Sterling. Makkelie's decision was backed by Roberto Rosetti, the chairman of the UEFA referees’ committee, who pointed out that the match VAR officials told Makkelie the penalty was "correct".

Danny Makkelie was also present as a referee during the 2022 FIFA World Cup in which he was the referee for two group stage matches.

Video assistant refereeing
Makkelie was the video assistant referee in the 2016 FIFA Club World Cup Final, video assistant referee in the 2017 FIFA U-20 World Cup Final, video assistant referee in the 2018 FIFA World Cup Final, video assistant referee in the 2018 FIFA Club World Cup Final and video assistant referee in the 2019 UEFA Champions League Final. He was also video assistant referee during the 2019 FIFA Women's World Cup in which he applied the new law changes in order to let penalties retaken in the France–Nigeria and Jamaica–Italy matches.

See also
 List of football referees

References

1983 births
Living people
People from Willemstad
Dutch football referees
Sportspeople from Dordrecht
2018 FIFA World Cup referees
UEFA Euro 2020 referees
2022 FIFA World Cup referees
FIFA World Cup referees